The 1916 Carlisle Indians football team represented the Carlisle Indian Industrial School as an independent during the 1916 college football season. Led by Morton L. Clevett in his first and only season as head coach, the Indians compiled a record of 3–4–1.

Schedule

References

Carlisle
Carlisle Indians football seasons
Carlisle Indians football